is a Japanese surname. Notable people with the surname include:

, gymnast
, Japanese-American activist and author
, mathematician and computer scientist
, Japanese footballer
, baseball pitcher

Japanese-language surnames